Ishani Sharma is an Indian television actress known for her portrayal of Anokhi in Star Plus's Humko Tumse Ho Gaya Hai Pyaar Kya Karein and Milli in Colors TV's Bepannah.

Filmography

Television

Films

References

External links
 

Living people
Indian soap opera actresses
Indian television actresses
Actresses in Hindi television
Year of birth missing (living people)